Juveniles held at the Guantanamo Bay detention camp numbered fifteen, according to a 2011 study by the Center for the Study of Human Rights in the Americas at the University of California Davis. The U.S. State Department had publicly acknowledged twelve. The US Department of Defense defined minors at Guantanamo as those below the age of 16, whereas they are defined as below the age of 18 in international law. Three juveniles aged below 16 were held in Camp Iguana, but others between 16 and 18 were put into the general population and treated as adults. These included Omar Khadr, a Canadian citizen who was 15 when captured and one of the youngest detainees, 16 when transported to Guantanamo.

May 2008 report to the United Nations
On May 15, 2008 the American Civil Liberties Union published a report that the Bush Presidency had submitted to the United Nations Committee on the Rights of the Child. The report stated that the USA had apprehended 2500 juveniles—2400 of them in Iraq. It said that a total of ten juveniles had been held in the Bagram Theater Detention Facility in Afghanistan and that eight juveniles had been held in the Guantanamo Bay detention camps.

List of known juveniles held at the Guantanamo Bay detention camps
Department of Defense documents acknowledge that at least fifteen children were at one time imprisoned at Guantanamo:

In addition, the UC Davis report lists six detainees who might have been 17 at the time of transfer to Guantanamo:

See also
 Military use of children

Notes

External links
WikiLeaks and the 22 Children of Guantánamo Andy Worthington
U.S. Has Detained 2,500 Juveniles as Enemy Combatants
Guantánamo: pain and distress for thousands of children

War on terror

Juveniles
Juveniles held at the Guantanamo Bay detention camp